Wayne Michael Noon (born  5 February 1971, Grimsby, England) is a former professional cricket wicket-keeper and batsman.

Noon played a total of 92 first-class, 121 list A and 4 twenty20 matches for Northamptonshire and Nottinghamshire between 1988 and 2003. In 1990 he captained, batted and kept wicket for the England Under-19 Cricket Team in the Australia Young Cricketers v England Young Cricketers first test.

References

1971 births
Living people
English cricketers
Canterbury cricketers
Northamptonshire cricketers
Nottinghamshire cricketers
Cricketers from Grimsby
People educated at Caistor Grammar School
Wicket-keepers